A self-help book is one that is written with the intention to instruct its readers on solving personal problems. The books take their name from Self-Help, an 1859 best-seller by Samuel Smiles, but are also known and classified under "self-improvement", a term that is a modernized version of self-help. Self-help books moved from a niche position to being a postmodern cultural phenomenon in the late twentieth century.

Early history

Informal guides to everyday behaviour might be said to have existed almost as long as writing itself. Ancient Egyptian "Codes" of conduct "have a curiously modern note: 'you trail from street to street, smelling of beer...like a broken rudder, good for nothing....you have been found performing acrobatics on a wall!. Micki McGee writes: "Some social observers have suggested that the Bible is perhaps the first and most significant of self-help books".

In classical Rome, Cicero's On Friendship and On Duties became "handbooks and guides...through the centuries", and Ovid wrote Art of Love and Remedy of Love. The former has been described as "the best sex book, as valid for San Francisco and London as for ancient Rome", dealing "with practical problems of everyday life: where to go to meet girls, how to start a conversation with them, how to keep them interested, and...how to be sociable rather than athletic in bed"; the latter has been described as containing "a series of instructions, as frank as they are ingenious and brilliantly expressed, on falling out of love".

Many Islamic scholars write books that could be categorized as self-help books, one prominent example is Al-Ghazali who wrote Ay farzand (O son!) which is a short book of counsel that al-Ghazali wrote for one of his students. The book was early translated to Arabic entitled ayyuhal walad. Another is Disciplining the Soul, which is one of the key sections of The Revival of the Religious Sciences.

During renaissance, a line of descent may be traced back from Smiles' Self-Help to when "the Renaissance concern with self-fashioning produced a flood of educational and self-help materials": thus "the Florentine Giovanni della Casa in his book of manners published in 1558 suggests: 'It is also an unpleasant habit to lift another person's wine or his food to your nose and smell it. The Middle Ages saw the genre personified in "Conduir-amour" ("guide in love matters").

The postmodern phenomenon

It is however since the 1960s or so that the humble self-help book has jumped to cultural prominence, a fact admitted by both the advocates and the critics – often highly polarised – of the self-improvement genre. Some would 'view the buying of such books...as an exercise in self-education'. Others, more critical, still concede that 'it is too prevalent and powerful a phenomenon to overlook, despite belonging to "pop" culture'.

For better or worse, it is clear that self-help books have had 'a very important role in developing social concepts of disease in the twentieth century', and that they 'disseminate these concepts through the general public so that ordinary people acquire a language for describing some of the complex and ineffable features of emotional and behavioral life'.

Where traditional psychology and psychotherapy will tend to be written in an impersonal, objective mode, many self-help books 'involve a first-person involvement and often a conversion experience': in keeping with the self-help support groups on which they often draw, horizontal peer-support and validation is thus offered the reader, as well as advice "from above".

Yet arguably with the movement from the self-help group to the individual "self-improvement" reader something of that peer support has been lost, reflecting the broader way that 'over the course of the last three decades of the twentieth-century, there has been a significant shift in the meaning of "self-help"'. A collective enterprise has become a refashioning of the individual self: 'in less than thirty years, "self-help" – once synonymous with mutual aid – has come to be understood...as a largely individual undertaking'.

Behind the self-help book explosion

'What social theorists call "detraditionalization" – the tendency of advancing capitalism to disrupt the cultures and traditions that may stand in the way of the accumulation of profit' has been seen as underpinning behind the self-help phenomenon in two (overlapping) ways. The first is the eclipse of the informal, communitarian transmission of folkways and folk wisdom: 'the charge that when self-help writers are being simplistic and repetitious, they are also being banal and unoriginal, merely offering their readers platitudes...on behalf of the best parts of folk wisdom', may simply be because they are providing a formal conduit for the conveyance of such "home truths" in an increasingly unstructured and anomic world.

The other result of the loss of 'Weber's "traditional behavior...everyday action to which people have become habitually accustomed"' is an increased social pressure for Self-fashioning: 'while one's identity might have been formerly anchored in (and limited by) a community...the self-creating self must create a written narrative of his or her life'. self-help books 'written and read for the purpose of helping people build a personal philosophy' contribute to that end.

The danger may arise however of an overestimation of the possibilities of change, given that 'we do not in any meaningful sense intend or choose our birth, our parents, our bodies, our language, our culture, our thoughts, our dreams, our desires, our death, and so on'. In the  PsyBlog-Understand Your Mind , Dr. Jeremy Dean states that "the dark side of hope is that claims about potential improvement can, and are, grossly exaggerated, in order to prise open our wallets. Similarly a bright and breezy approach to potential change may lead us to believe that changing ourselves is easy, when often it requires considerable, sometimes monumental, effort". Even when self-help books offer realistic advice, they are usually not something the reader does not already know (i.e. eat less to lose weight). The 'Twelve-step "Traditions"...have fostered a notion of individual self-mastery or self-control as limited...use of the Serenity Prayer encourages individuals to accept what they cannot change, to find courage to change what they can change, and to seek wisdom in discerning the difference'. Self-help books will indeed often acknowledge formally that 'this book does not replace the need for therapy and counselling for troubled relationships or survivors of a dysfunctional family'. In practice however, fueled by competitive advertising, often 'such books hold out to the reader the promise of a virtually "instantaneous" transformation'; and there ensues something of a 'built-in contradiction of the celebratory arc of the self-help book combined with the stubborn realities' of the human world.

The reader may go away disillusioned; or may seek for the answer in the next book, so that 'self-help books can become an addiction in and of themselves' – a process that will 'have fostered the belabored self' rather than relieving it. In that perspective, since all self-help books 'have at least one common message. They tell you that you have the power to change yourself....By implication all of these books are saying, if you are in pain, if you are stuck and can't seem to change, it's no one's fault but your own'.

It is important to note that the popularity of self-help books may cause a placebo effect and thus appear to be an effective way to change an individual's way of thinking about their life and selves. This is because individuals will believe these books will change their lives like others have endorsed.

Characteristics

Self-help books often focus on popular psychology such as romantic relationships, or aspects of the mind and human behavior which believers in self-help feel can be controlled with effort. 
Self-help books typically advertise themselves as being able to increase self-awareness and performance, including satisfaction with one's life. They often say that they can help you achieve this more quickly than with conventional therapies. Many celebrities have marketed self-help books including Jennifer Love Hewitt, Oprah Winfrey, Elizabeth Taylor, Charlie Fitzmaurice, Tony Robbins, Wayne Dyer, Deepak Chopra and Cher.

Like most books, self-help books can be purchased both offline and online; 'between 1972 and 2000, the numbers of self-help books...increased from 1.1 percent to 2.4 percent of the total number of books in print'.

Fictional analogues

Stephen Potter's "Upmanship" books are satirical takes on status-seeking under the cloak of sociableness – 'remember, that it is just on such occasions that an appearance of geniality is most important' – cast in advice-book form. A few decades later, with the neoliberal turn, such advice – 'Remember the reality of self-interest' – would be being seriously advocated in the self-help world: in bestsellers like Swim with the Sharks, all 'kinds of seemingly benign guile are encouraged', on the principle that 'status displays matter: just don't be suckered by them yourself'.

Perhaps the best-known fictional embodiment of the world of the self-help book is Bridget Jones. Taking 'self-help books...[as] a new form of religion' – 'a kind of secularised religion – a sort of moral values lite' – she struggles to integrate its often conflicting instructions into a coherent whole. 'She must stop beating herself over the head with Women Who Love Too Much and instead think more towards Men Are from Mars, Women Are from Venus...see Richard's behaviour less as a sign that she is co-dependent and loving too much and more in the light of him being like a Martian rubber band'. Even she, however, has the occasional crisis of faith, when she wonders: 'Maybe it helps if you've never read a self-help book in your life'.

In the BookWorld Companion, it is suggested that 'those of you who have tired of the glitzy world of shopping and inappropriate boyfriends in Chicklit, a trip to Dubious Lifestyle Advice might be the next step. An hour in the hallowed halls of invented ills will leave you with at least ten problems you never knew you had, let alone existed'.

See also
 Business fable
 Conduct book – A precursor to self-help books from the Middle Ages to the 18th Century
 Mirrors for princes
 New Thought
 Occultism
List of occult writers
 Positive thinking
 Spirituality
 New Age
 The Wellness Doctrines (2015) self-help book

References

Non-fiction genres